Reunion is the sixth studio album by the American psychedelic rock group Country Joe and the Fish, released in 1977. It constituted a reunion of the members of the 1967 band. It was produced by Sam Charters for Fantasy Records and recorded between January and April 1977. The music is not as psychedelic, and several tracks are country rock.

Track listing
Side 1
"Come to the Reunion" (Gary Hirsh) – 3:03
"Time Flies By" (Joe McDonald) - 4:09
"Stateline Nevada" (Barry Melton) - 2:03
"Love Is a Mystery" (Barry Melton) - 2:04
"Dirty Claus Rag" (Joe McDonald, B. McDonald, Sam Charters, Phil Marsh) - 2:04
"Not So Sweet Martha Lorraine" (Joe McDonald) - 3:25
Side 2
"Thunderbird" (Joe McDonald) - 3:42 
"Gibson's Song" (instrumental) (David Bennett Cohen) - 3:37
"No One Can Teach You How to Love" (Barry Melton) - 3:16
"Insufficient Funds" (Bruce Barthol, Phil Marsh) - 2:36
"Dreams" (David Bennett Cohen, Richardson) - 2:55
Total time: 35:32

Personnel
Country Joe and The Fish
 Country Joe McDonald — vocals, acoustic guitar; trombone (track 3), harmonica (track 10)
 Barry Melton — vocals, electric and acoustic guitars, mandolin, Dobro; synthesizer (track 9)
 David Bennett Cohen — keyboards, acoustic and electric guitars
 Bruce Barthol — bass; vocals (track 10)
 Gary "Chicken" Hirsh — drums, percussion; sandblocks (track 5)

Additional personnel
 John Otis — congas
Jim Price — horns
Bobby Keys — horns
Trevor Lawrence — horns
Steve Madaio — horns
Sam Charters — jug (track 5)

References

Reunion
Reunion
Country Joe and the Fish albums
Albums produced by Samuel Charters